Haines Junction is a village in Yukon, Canada. It is at Kilometre 1,632 (historical mile 1016) of the Alaska Highway at its junction with the Haines Highway, hence the name of the community. According to the 2021 Census, the population was 688. However, the Yukon Bureau of Statistics lists the population count for 2022 as 1,018.

Haines Junction lies east of Kluane National Park and Reserve. It is a major administrative centre for the Champagne and Aishihik First Nations.

History
For around two thousand years, the Southern Tutchone people had seasonal hunting and fishing camps in the area of present-day Haines Junction. The original name of the area was "Dakwakada", a Southern Tutchone word meaning "high cache". It was common for Tutchone people to use raised log caches to store food year-round or temporarily while they hunted and fished in an area.

The Haines Junction area was also important for trade between the coastal and interior peoples. It lies at the interior end of the Chilkat Pass, one of only three passes that allowed travel between the coast and the interior, which was used extensively for trade between the coastal Tlingit and Southern Tutchone people.

The current town of Haines Junction was established in 1942 and 1943 during the construction of the Alaska Highway (ALCAN). In 1943, a second highway, the Haines Highway, was built to connect the Alaska Highway with the coastal town of Haines, Alaska, over the Chilkat Pass. Situated at the junction of these two highways, Haines Junction was a construction camp and a supply and service centre for the U.S. Army Corps of Engineers building the highway. The  Haines–Fairbanks petroleum pipeline was constructed in 1953–55, and a pumping station was built just north of Haines Junction.

Geography

Climate 
Haines Junction has a subarctic climate (Dfc) with mild summers and long, severely cold and snowy winters, with annual snowfall averaging 64.5 inches (164 cm).

Demographics 

Infrastructure 

By road, Haines Junction is served by the Alaska Highway and the Haines Highway (Yukon Highway 3). By air, it is served by the Haines Junction Airport.

Fibre connections to most homes and businesses are becoming available in late 2022/early 2023. Bell Mobility operates a cellular network tower in the area.

See also
 List of municipalities in Yukon

References

External links

Villages in Yukon
Southern Tutchone